Pseudacherusia is a genus of beetles in the family Buprestidae, containing the following species:

 Pseudacherusia bartoni Obenberger, 1940
 Pseudacherusia theryi Kerremans, 1905

References

Buprestidae genera